The 1977 All-Big Ten Conference football team consists of American football players chosen by various organizations for All-Big Ten Conference teams for the 1977 Big Ten Conference football season. Conference co-champions Ohio State and Michigan led with eight and six first-team selections, respectively. Ohio State's first-team selections included running back Ron Springs and linebacker Tom Cousineau.  Michigan's first-team selections included quarterback Rick Leach and offensive guard Mark Donahue.

Offensive selections

Quarterbacks

 Rick Leach, Michigan (AP-1; UPI-2)
 Rod Gerald, Ohio State (UPI-1)
 Mark Herrmann, Purdue (AP-2)

Running backs
 Ron Springs, Ohio State (AP-1; UPI-1)
 Ric Enis, Indiana (AP-1; UPI-1)
 Jeff Logan, Ohio State (UPI-1)
 Russell Davis, Michigan (UPI-2)
 Harlan Huckleby, Michigan (UPI-2)

Flankers
 Keith Calvin, Indiana (AP-1)

Wide receivers
 Reggie Arnold, Purdue (AP-1; UPI-1)
 Kirk Gibson, Michigan State (UPI-2)

Tight ends
 Jimmy Moore, Ohio State (AP-1; UPI-1)
 Mark Brammer, Michigan State (UPI-2)

Centers
 Walt Downing, Michigan (AP-1)
 Al Pitts, Michigan State (UPI-1)
 Mark Slater, Minnesota (UPI-2)

Guards

 Mark Donahue, Michigan (AP-1; UPI-1)
 Kevin Pancratz, Illinois (AP-1; UPI-1)
 Mark Lang, Ohio State (UPI-2)
 Frank Malec, Northwestern (UPI-2)

Tackles
 Chris Ward, Ohio State (AP-1; UPI-1)
 Mike Kenn, Michigan (AP-1; UPI-2)
 Charles Peal, Indiana (UPI-1)
 Tony Ardizzone, Northwestern (UPI-2)

Defensive selections

Front five
 Larry Bethea, Michigan State (AP-1; UPI-1 [def. tackle])
 Aaron Brown, Ohio State (AP-1; UPI-1 [middle guard])
 Kelton Dansler, Ohio State (AP-1; UPI-1 [def. end])
 Steve Midboe, Minnesota (AP-1; UPI-1 [def. tackle])
 Dennis Stejskal, Wisconsin (AP-1; UPI-1 [def. end])
 John Anderson, Michigan (UPI-1 [def. end])
 Paul Ross, Ohio State (UPI-2 [def. end])
 Eddie Beamon, Ohio State (UPI-2 [def. tackle])
 Byron Cato, Ohio State (UPI-2 [def. tackle])
 Steve Graves, Michigan (UPI-2 [middle guard])

Linebackers
 Tom Cousineau, Ohio State (AP-1; UPI-1)
 Tom Rusk, Iowa (AP-1; UPI-1)
 John Sullivan, Illinois (AP-1)
 Ron Simpkins, Michigan (UPI-1)
 Paul Rudzinski, Michigan State (UPI-2)

Defensive backs

 Ray Griffin, Ohio State (AP-1; UPI-1)
 Mike Guess, Ohio State (AP-1; UPI-1)
 Dwight Hicks, Michigan (AP-1; UPI-1)
 Jim Pickens, Michigan (UPI-1)
 Derek Howard, Michigan (UPI-2)
 Lawrence Johnson, Wisconsin (UPI-2)
 Mark Anderson, Michigan State (UPI-2)
 Dave Abrams, Indiana (UPI-2)

Special teams

Placekicker
 Paul Rogind, Minnesota (AP-1)
 Hans Nielsen, Michigan State (UPI-1)
 Keith Calvin, Indiana (UPI-2)

Punter
 Ray Stachowicz, Michigan State (AP-1; UPI-1)
 John Anderson, Michigan (UPI-2)

Key
AP = Associated Press, selected by a panel of 12 sports writers and broadcasters

UPI = United Press International, selected by the Big Ten coaches

Bold = Consensus first-team selection of both the AP and UPI

See also
1977 College Football All-America Team

References

All-Big Ten Conference
All-Big Ten Conference football teams